The Rosedale Odd Fellows Temple in Boise, Idaho, is a 2-story building with a prominent stepped gable. An early example in Boise of cast concrete block construction, the building was designed by Tourtellotte & Co., and it was completed in 1907. 

The Rosedale Odd Fellows Temple was added to the National Register of Historic Places in 1982.

The International Order of Odd Fellows was an active fraternal organization in Idaho at the beginning of the 20th century. Boise already included lodge No. 3, organized in 1868, lodge No. 77, organized in 1900, and lodge No. 97, organized in 1902. The Rosedale lodge, No. 102, was organized in 1904 in South Boise, and it was described by the Idaho Statesman as "one of the best equipped fraternal buildings in Idaho."

See also
 Ada Odd Fellows Temple
 Chinese Odd Fellows Building

References

External links
 
 Grand Lodge of Idaho, I.O.O.F.

		
National Register of Historic Places in Ada County, Idaho
Buildings and structures completed in 1907
Buildings and structures in Boise, Idaho
Odd Fellows buildings in Idaho